Bishops House or Bishop's House or Bishops' House may refer to:

Australia 
 Bishop's House, Cairns, a heritage-listed house in Queensland
 Bishop's House, Perth, a heritage-listed house in Western Australia
 Bishop's House, Toowoomba, a heritage-listed house in Queensland
 Bishop's Lodge, Townsville, a heritage-listed house in Queensland

Hong Kong 
 Bishop's House, Hong Kong, sometimes referred to as "Bishops House"

United Kingdom 
Bishops' House, Sheffield, a home built c.1500, sometimes referred to as "Bishops House"
Bishop's House, Birmingham
 Bishop's House, Iona

United States 
 Bishop's House (Portland, Oregon)

See also
 Russian Bishop's House, historic house in Sitka, Alaska, sometimes referred to as "Bishops House", "Bishop's House", or "Bishops' House"
Bishop House (disambiguation)